Andreas Stokbro Nielsen (born 8 April 1997 in Brøndby) is a Danish cyclist, who currently rides for UCI Continental team . For the 2023 season, he will join UCI Continental team . He previously competed for UCI WorldTeam  for the 2020 and 2021 seasons.

Major results

Road

2015
 1st Stage 2b Trofeo Karlsberg
2016
 3rd Road race, National Under-23 Road Championships
 5th Overall ZLM Tour
1st Stage 3
2017
 2nd Road race, National Under-23 Road Championships
 4th Himmerland Rundt
 4th Fyen Rundt
 5th Ronde van Overijssel
2018
 1st Stage 4 (TTT) Tour de l'Avenir
 2nd Road race, National Under-23 Road Championships
2019
 1st Ronde van Vlaanderen Beloften
 4th Road race, National Road Championships
2022
 Oberösterreich Rundfahrt 
1st Stage 1  
1st Mountain Classification
 1st Grand Prix Herning
 1st Stage 2 Tour du Loir-et-Cher
 2nd Ringerike GP
 2nd International Rhodes Grand Prix
 2nd Gylne Gutuer 
 4th Road race, National Road Championships
 7th Sundvolden GP
2023
 1st Grand Prix de la Ville de Lillers Souvenir Bruno Comini 
 10th Le Samyn

Gravel
2022
 UCI Gravel World Series
1st Gravel One Fifty
 10th UCI World Championships

References

External links

1997 births
Living people
Danish male cyclists
People from Brøndby Municipality
Sportspeople from the Capital Region of Denmark